Yoon Hyun-min (born April 15, 1985) is a South Korean actor

Biography
After graduating from Cheongwon high school, Yoon was a baseball player for the Hanwha Eagles in 2005 and the Doosan Bears in 2006. He fell in love with the stage after watching Finding Kim Jong-wook, and quit sports to start acting in 2007, starring in the musical Spring Awakening. 

Yoon later transitioned to television dramas, making his debut in the OCN drama Joseon Mystery Detective Jeong Yak-yong. He has since taken on notable supporting roles in Heartless City (2013), A Witch's Love (2014), Discovery of Love (2014),. and Beating Again (2015) 

Yoon played his first leading role in the family drama My Daughter, Geum Sa-wol (2015). He gained increased recognition after starring in crime drama Tunnel. Yoon then played lead roles in legal drama Witch at Court (2017), and fantasy romance drama Tale of Fairy (2018). In 2019, Yoon was cast in Netflix's science fiction romance series My Holo Love.

In 2020, Yoon starred in the romantic comedy Men are Men alongside Hwang Jung-eum and Seo Ji-hoon.

Personal life
Yoon has been in a relationship with his My Daughter, Geum Sa-wol co-star, Baek Jin-hee, since April 2016

Filmography

Television series

Film

Television shows

Theater

Discography

Awards and nominations

References

External links
 
 
 

1985 births
Living people
South Korean male television actors
South Korean male film actors
South Korean male musical theatre actors
South Korean male stage actors